The Commission on Revenue Allocation  is a Kenya government Commission  established  under Article 215 and 216 of the Constitution of Kenya.

Role
Its key role is recommendation of the basis for equitable sharing of revenues raised nationally between the National and the County Governments as well as sharing of revenue among the County Governments.

Membership
The current membership of the Commission is as follows:
 Micah Cheserem - Chairman    
 Fatuma Abdulkadir - Vice-chairperson
 Prof. Wafula Massai 
 Amina Ahmed
 Prof. Joseph Kimura
 Rose Osoro
 Prof. Raphael Munavu
 Meshack Onyango
 Joseph Kinyua (Permanent Secretary Treasury)

Notable Recommendations
The commission recommended the following formula for sharing the resources among the county governments
 Population – 45%
 Basic equal share – 25%
 Poverty index – 20%
 Land area – 8%
 Fiscal responsibility – 2%

References

External links 

 'Official Site'

Politics of Kenya
Government agencies of Kenya
2012 in Kenya
Law of Kenya
Kenya articles by importance
Finance in Africa